Teufelsbach is a small river of North Rhine-Westphalia, Germany. It is a tributary of the Müggenbach which is itself a tributary of the Morsbach.

See also
List of rivers of North Rhine-Westphalia

Rivers of North Rhine-Westphalia
Rivers of Germany